The Confederación de Unificación Sindical ('Confederation of Trade Union Unity', CUS) is a national trade union center in Nicaragua. It was formed in 1964 as the Nicaraguan Trade Union Council (CSN).

ICTUR reports that following the Sandinista revolution the CUS rapidly diminished - a result of its involvement with the previous government.

The CUS is affiliated with the International Trade Union Confederation.

References

Trade unions in Nicaragua
International Trade Union Confederation
Trade unions established in 1964